Mindaribba railway station is located on the North Coast line in New South Wales, Australia. It serves the rural locality of the same name. It is served by NSW TrainLink Hunter line services travelling between Newcastle and Dungog.

The station opened in August 1911 as Dunmore and was renamed Mindaribba the following year.

Platforms & services
Mindaribba consists of a single wooden platform about three metres long. It is served by NSW TrainLink Hunter line services travelling between Newcastle and Dungog. There are five Dungog services and four Newcastle Services on weekdays, with three services in each direction on weekends and public holidays. It is a request stop with passengers required to notify the guard if they wish to alight. The platform is so small that it has attracted some media attention

Opposite the platform is a 1,500 metre crossing loop.

References

External links
Mindaribba station details Transport for New South Wales
Photo of the former platform and buildings

Railway stations in the Hunter Region
Railway stations in Australia opened in 1911
Regional railway stations in New South Wales
Short-platform railway stations in New South Wales, 1 car or less